Duboisvalia simulans is a moth in the Castniidae family. It is found in Colombia, Bolivia, Venezuela, Peru and Brazil.

Subspecies
Duboisvalia simulans simulans (Colombia, Bolivia, Venezuela)
Duboisvalia simulans melessus (Druce, 1890) (Peru)
Duboisvalia simulans michaeli (Preiss, 1899) (Brazil: Amazonas)
Duboisvalia simulans modificata (Strand, 1913) (Colombia)
Duboisvalia simulans securis (Talbot, 1929) (Brazil: Amazonas)
Duboisvalia simulans songata (Strand, 1913) (Bolivia)
Duboisvalia simulans tarapotensis (Preiss, 1899) (Peru)

References

Castniidae
Moths of South America
Moths described in 1875